The Wateler Peace Prize is awarded annually by the Dutch Carnegie Foundation and is named for J.G.D. Wateler who, upon his death on 22 July 1927 "bequeathed his estate to the Dutch State, under the proviso that the annual revenue accruing from it should be expended upon the awarding of a prize to those who have made themselves meritorious in the cause of peace."

Laureates

See also 
List of peace prizes

References
Vredespaleis, list of laureates

Peace awards
Dutch awards